Zaur Svanadze (born 23 January 1958) is a Georgian football manager and a former player. He is the assistant manager of Dinamo Tbilisi.

Playing career
Having spent some years in his hometown club Torpedo Kutaisi, Svanadze moved to Dinamo Tbilisi in 1981. He was one of the members of the famous Dinamo Tbilisi squad, which won UEFA Cup Winners' Cup back in 1980-81, being substituted by Nukri Kakilashvili in the final against FC Carl Zeiss Jena.

Managing career
Svanadze worked some Georgian clubs before moving to Azerbaijan.

He joined the coaching staff of Kakhaber Tskhadadze at Inter Baku in 2012, before taking charge at the club three years later, after Tskhadadze was appointed as the manager of Georgia national football team.

Honours
Dinamo Tbilisi
UEFA Cup Winners' Cup: 1980-81

References

External links
 

1958 births
Sportspeople from Kutaisi
Living people
Soviet footballers
Association football midfielders
Footballers from Georgia (country)
FC Dinamo Tbilisi players
IFK Holmsund players
Umeå FC players
Motala AIF players
Soviet Top League players
Soviet expatriate footballers
Soviet expatriate sportspeople in Sweden
Expatriate footballers in Sweden
Expatriate footballers from Georgia (country)
Expatriate sportspeople from Georgia (country) in Sweden
Expatriate sportspeople from Georgia (country) in Azerbaijan
Football managers from Georgia (country)
FC Lokomotivi Tbilisi managers
FC Dinamo Tbilisi managers
Expatriate football managers from Georgia (country)
Expatriate football managers in Sweden
Expatriate football managers in Azerbaijan